Bapco, BAPCo or BAPCO may refer to:

 BAPCo consortium, Business Application Performance Corporation
 Bahrain Petroleum Company
 BellSouth Advertising & Publishing Corporation